The Beijing–Tongliao or Jingtong railway, also known as the Shahe–Tongliao or Shatong railway, is a railroad in northern China between Beijing, the national capital, and Tongliao in the Inner Mongolia Autonomous Region. The line was built between 1972 and 1977, and entered into operations in 1980. Major cities and counties along route include Beijing, Luanping, Longhua, Chifeng and Tongliao.

History
The building of the Beijing–Tongliao railway began in October 1972 and was divided into three phases. The construction planning phase took one and a half year. The main construction took four years and was completed on December 12, 1977. The final phase to prepare the line for commercial operation took another two and a half years. The line officially opened on May 1, 1980. At the height of construction, more than 200,000 workers participated in the project.

At the time of its construction, the railway was notable for being the second rail line, after the Beijing–Harbin (Jingha) railway, to traverse the Great Wall and connect northern and northeastern China. Whereas the Jingha Line skirts the coast, the Jingtong line runs inland through the rugged Yan Mountains. The Jingtong railway has 116 tunnels that are collectively  in length, including the  Red Flag Tunnel. In all bridges and tunnels account for 15% of the line's total length.

Route

In Beijing, the Jingtong line begins at Changping North Railway Station, in suburban Changping District north of the city. At Changping North Station, the lines branches off of the Beijing-Baotou Railway and heads northeast through Huairou and Miyun Districts Beijing–Baotou railway and then heads northeast through Huairou and Miyun Districts and leaves the city at Gubeikou Pass in the Yan Mountains. The line continues north through Luanping and Longhua counties of Hebei Province before reaching Chifeng in Inner Mongolia. From Chifeng, the line runs northeast following National Highway 111 across the Zhelimu Desert to Tongliao.

Rail Junctions
Changping North: Beijing–Baotou railway
Tongliao: Jining–Tongliao railway; Tongliao–Ranghulu railway

See also

 List of railways in China
Rail transport in Inner Mongolia

References

External links

Railway lines in China
Rail transport in Beijing
Rail transport in Hebei
Rail transport in Inner Mongolia
25 kV AC railway electrification